NZT may refer to:

 New Zealand Time, the time zone for New Zealand
 NZT-48 (aka NZT), a fictional mind-expanding drug from the Limitless franchise
 Nikola NZT, a proposed electric off-road powersport side-by-side vehicle
 NZT, an assembly language command for the Signetics 8X300
 NZT (Toyota), a model code; see List of Toyota model codes
 Nazareth station (rail code: NZT), Nazareth, Tamil Nadu, India; see List of railway stations in India
 Nacionalinės žemės tarnybos (NŽT; National Land Service), the Lithuanian national mapping agency

See also